Hádek is a Czech surname. Notable people with the surname include:

Kryštof Hádek (born 1982), Czech actor, brother of Matěj
Matěj Hádek (born 1975), Czech actor
Michael Hádek (born 1990), Czech motorcycle speedway rider

Czech-language surnames